Frederick Dale Bruner (born 1932) is an American biblical scholar.

Career
Frederick Dale Bruner is a theologian and author of several works, including a critical examination of Pentecostal theology, entitled "A Theology of the Holy Spirit," and his multi-volumed commentaries on the Gospels of Matthew and John (all three published by Eerdman's). Bruner, who calls himself a Reformed biblical theologian, writes principally for the Church, not the Academy, and considers this the highest calling of theological exegetes.

Bruner became a Christian under the teaching of Henrietta Mears at the First Presbyterian Church of Hollywood. It was there that he met his wife Kathy and discerned his call to be a professor and missionary. He earned his Masters of Theology and B.D. at Princeton Theological Seminary and his Th.D. at the University of Hamburg in Germany in 1963. He entered the mission field the following year, teaching at the Union Theological Seminary in Manila, Philippines from 1964–1975. From 1975–1997, Dr. Bruner taught at Whitworth College in Spokane, Washington and held the position of George & Lyda Wasson Professor of Religion. Since his retirement, a chaired position was created in his honor, which is currently held by noted theologian, Dr. Adam Neder. Since 1997, Bruner has been on the adjunct faculty at the Fuller Theological Seminary, in Pasadena, California, where he continues to write and research. His current project is a commentary on the book of Romans. Bruner also taught a weekly bible study class from September 1998 through June 2016 at the First Presbyterian Church of Hollywood, which was his home church while a college student at Occidental.

Bruner has two sons and four grandchildren and he and his wife live in Pasadena, CA.

Education
Bruner earned his bachelor's degree from Occidental College in 1954.  He earned his Master of Divinity from Princeton Theological Seminary, and his Doctor of Theology (Th.D.) at the University of Hamburg in Germany in 1963.

Works
 The Letter to the Romans: A Short Commentary (Eerdmans, 2021)
 The Gospel of John: A Commentary (Feb 2012)
 Matthew: A Commentary (2 volumes; revised and expanded edition, Eerdmans, 2004).
 A Theology of the Holy Spirit: The Pentecostal Experience and the New Testament Witness. Eerdmans,1970

References

External links
seminar at Calvin
First Presbyterian Church of Hollywood

American biblical scholars
Living people
1932 births
Bible commentators
Occidental College alumni
Princeton Theological Seminary alumni
University of Hamburg alumni
Calvinist and Reformed biblical scholars